Yokoyama is a Japanese surname. Notable people with the surname include:

 Akihito Yokoyama (born 1961), Japanese golfer
 Chisa Yokoyama (born 1969), Japanese voice actress and singer
 Go Yokoyama in fact Tsuyoshi Yokoyama (b. 1983), Japanese kickboxer
 Hideo Yokoyama (born 1957), Japanese novelist
, Japanese shogi player
Hiroki Yokoyama (disambiguation), multiple people
 Hirotoshi Yokoyama (born 1975), Japanese football player
 Hokuto Yokoyama (born 1963), Japanese politician (Democratic Party of Japan)
 Isamu Yokoyama (1889-1952), general in the Imperial Japanese Army
 Juri Yokoyama (born 1955), Japanese volleyball player
 Katsuya Yokoyama (1934–2010), renowned player and teacher of the shakuhachi, a traditional Japanese vertical bamboo flute
 Ken Yokoyama (disambiguation), multiple people
 Kenzo Yokoyama (born 1943), Japanese football player and coach
 Knock Yokoyama (1932–2007), Japanese comedian and politician
 Kumi Yokoyama (born 1993), Japanese football striker
, Japanese cross-country skier
, Japanese basketball player
 Marumitsu Yokoyama in fact Okitaka Yokoyama (1780–1854), Japanese late Edo period samurai and founder of the Tōkyūjutsu
, Japanese pole vaulter
 Masafumi Yokoyama (born 1956), Japanese football player
 Masami Yokoyama (born 1981), Japanese volleyball player
 Matsuo Yokoyama (born 1927), president of Walt Disney Enterprises of Japan
 Matsusaburō Yokoyama (1838–1884), pioneering Japanese photographer, artist, lithographer and teacher
, Japanese actress
, Japanese badminton player
 Minehiro Yokoyama (born 1971), Japanese ski mountaineer
 Mitsuteru Yokoyama (1934–2004), Japanese manga artist
 Naoki Yokoyama (born 1949), Japanese electrical engineer
 Olga T. Yokoyama (born 1942), American linguist
 Sakujirō Yokoyama (1864–1912), early disciple of Kanō Jigorō
 Satoshi Yokoyama (born 1980), Japanese footballer
 Seiji Yokoyama (1935-2017), Japanese incidental music composer
 Shizuo Yokoyama (1890–1961), Japanese general in the Imperial Japanese Army
 Shōmatsu Yokoyama (1913–1992), Japanese physician
Sodō Yokoyama (1907-1980), Japanese zen priest
 Sumie Ishitaka (née Sumie Yokoyama), women's professional shogi player
 Sumiko Yokoyama (born 1974), Japanese cross-country skier
 Taikan Yokoyama, pseudonym of Sakai Hidemaro (1868–1958), major figure in pre-WW2 Japanese painting
, Japanese racing driver
, Japanese swimmer
, Japanese water polo player
 Takayuki Yokoyama (born 1972), Japanese football player
, Japanese footballer
 Takuya Yokoyama (born 1985), Japanese footballer
 Tomonobu Yokoyama (born 1985), Japanese footballer
 You Yokoyama (born 1981), Japanese idol, singer, actor, radio host and lyricist, member of band Kanjani 8
 Yui Yokoyama (born 1992), Japanese idol, member of girl-group AKB48
 Yuji Yokoyama (born 1969), Japanese footballer

See also 
 Yokoyama Dam, a dam in Ibigawa, in the Gifu Prefecture of Japan
 Yokoyama Station (disambiguation), multiple Japanese railway stations

Japanese-language surnames